Hollerich is a quarter in south-western Luxembourg City, in southern Luxembourg.

, the quarter has a population of 7,132 inhabitants.

Hollerich railway station is located on Chemins de Fer Luxembourgeois Line 70, which connects Luxembourg City to the south-west of the country.  Hollerich station is only 600 metres to the south-west of the country's main terminus, Luxembourg railway station, and just to the west of a major junction that separates traffic exiting Luxembourg station to the south. The urban park Parc Merl is located on its border with Belair.

Education
The Campus Geesseknäppchen, the largest educational campus in Luxembourg City, is located within the quarter. Five educational establishments are premised on the site; the Athénée de Luxembourg, the International School of Luxembourg, Lycée Aline Mayrisch, the Lycée Michel Rodange, the Lycée Technique École de Commerce et de Gestion) and the Conservatoire de Luxembourg. The campus boasts a number of shared facilities, including an Olympic size swimming pool.

Commune

Hollerich was a commune in the canton of Luxembourg until 26 March 1920, when it was merged into the city of Luxembourg, along with Hamm and Rollingergrund.  From 7 April 1914 until the dissolution of the commune, the part of the commune encompassing the urban areas of Hollerich and Bonnevoie was afforded the title of city.  The title was not conferred upon all of the commune; the part that was granted the title was officially styled 'Hollerich-Bonnevoie'.

It is also the location of Den Atelier, a music venue.

References

External link

Quarters of Luxembourg City
Former communes of Luxembourg